Acentrella turbida is a species of small minnow mayfly in the family Baetidae. It is found in Central America and North America. In North America its range includes all of Canada, northern Mexico, and at least 43 of the 50 states within the United States, including Alaska  No common name has been given to this insect.

References

External links

 

Mayflies
Articles created by Qbugbot
Insects described in 1924